Rockets Redglare (born Michael Morra; May 8, 1949 – May 28, 2001) was an American character actor and stand-up comedian. He appeared in over 30 films in the 1980s and 1990s, including a number of independent films and mainstream films, such as After Hours (1985) and Desperately Seeking Susan (1985).

Early life
He was born Michael Morra in New York City to a heroin-addicted 15-year-old mother named Agnes Tarulli Morra. While still in utero, he became addicted to heroin, so doctors added an opiate derivative into his baby formula so that he could withdraw from the drug. Morra's father and uncle were career criminals in the Italian-American underworld in Sheepshead Bay, Brooklyn. After his father was deported to his native Italy, Agnes began a relationship with a drug-addicted former boxer who assaulted both young Morra and the mother. Morra also spent time being raised by his aunt in Lindenhurst, New York. After his mother was killed by her boyfriend, Morra took up the stage name Rockets Redglare, from the fifth line of the U.S. national anthem "The Star-Spangled Banner".

1970s and 1980s
From 1970 to 1974, Morra spent time at Kinsman Hall, a drug rehab first located in Hauppauge, New York (early 1968), which then moved to Hillsdale, New York (late 1968) and eventually went to its new facility located in Jackman, Maine (mid 1970). He entered the program as a resident and became employed as a staff member, reaching the position of assistant residential director and then leaving to return home to New York. In the early 1970s, Rockets lived with the actress Baybi Day before moving into a second floor apartment on Third Avenue, off 14th Street. In the late 1970s, Morra spent most of his time in the East Village, where he "became a permanent fixture in the punk and porno film scenes." Morra worked as bouncer at the Red Bar in the East Village as a roadie for a band called The Hassles (with a young Billy Joel), and acted as a bodyguard and drug supplier to punk rock bassist Sid Vicious and artist-musician Jean-Michel Basquiat. The night Sid Vicious is alleged to have killed his girlfriend, Nancy Spungen, Morra had delivered 40 capsules of Dilaudid to the couple's room at the Chelsea Hotel. In his book, Pretty Vacant: A History of Punk, Phil Strongman states that he believes Redglare murdered Nancy Spungen. Redglare always denied involvement in Spungen's murder to the press, but often "confessed" to the murder within his circle of friends, to mixed reaction. Friends like Zoe Hansen took Redglare at his word, but others like Howie Pyro have cast doubt on Rockets' alleged claims, insisting he enjoyed telling exaggerated stories for attention.

Morra began performing stand-up comedy routines at East Village/Lower East Side bars such as Pyramid and Club 57 in his own show titled Taxi Cabaret, and he also did performance art. He made his acting debut in the 1985 Eric Mitchell film The Way It Is, also known as Euridice on the Avenues, a film whose cast also included Steve Buscemi and Vincent Gallo (who composed the soundtrack). Later that year, he appeared in the Jim Jarmusch film Down by Law. He often was cast as a rough or seedy character, which echoed his real-life upbringing and drug addiction.

Death
Morra died in 2001 from a combination of kidney failure, liver failure, cirrhosis and hepatitis C. Morra's death was hastened by his multiple addictions: He admitted that "Anything I ever liked ... I always did to excess," including heroin, cocaine, food, and alcohol. At the time of his death, Morra was morbidly obese and hospitalized. In 2003, director Luis Fernandez de la Reguera released a documentary about Morra titled Rockets Redglare! a "portrait of the New York personality from his early days around '50s hustlers to the East Village crowd of the '80s to his tragic death in 2001."

After Morra's death, obituary-writers tried to sum up Morra's life and involvement in New York's creative scenes. The Chicago Reader called Morra a "compulsive hustler who became obese once he decided to substitute beer for drugs," and acknowledges that "he was also a gifted raconteur", especially in informal, relaxed settings. Seattle newspaper The Stranger wrote that Morra became a New York City "alternative celebrity" in the city's East Village bars and clubs where he drank and told stories.

Filmography

References

External links
 
 Rockets Redglare, a retrospective

1949 births
2001 deaths
Male actors from New York City
American male film actors
American stand-up comedians
American male television actors
Deaths from cirrhosis
Deaths from hepatitis
Deaths from kidney failure
Comedians from New York City
Drug dealers
20th-century American comedians
20th-century American male actors
Alcohol-related deaths in New York City